Bagielnica  is a settlement in the administrative district of Gmina Szemud, within Wejherowo County, Pomeranian Voivodeship, in northern Poland.

For details of the history of the region, see History of Pomerania.

The settlement has a population of 16.

References

Bagielnica